Dharmakīrti (fl. c. 6th or 7th century; Tibetan: ཆོས་ཀྱི་གྲགས་པ་; Wylie: chos kyi grags pa), was an influential Indian Buddhist philosopher who worked at Nālandā. He was one of the key scholars of epistemology (pramāṇa) in Buddhist philosophy, and is associated with the Yogācāra and Sautrāntika schools. He was also one of the primary theorists of Buddhist atomism. His works influenced the scholars of Mīmāṃsā, Nyaya and Shaivism schools of Hindu philosophy as well as scholars of Jainism.

Dharmakīrti's Pramāṇavārttika, his largest and most important work, was very influential in India and Tibet as a central text on pramana ('valid knowledge instruments') and was widely commented on by various Indian and Tibetan scholars. His texts remain part of studies in the monasteries of Tibetan Buddhism.

History
Little is known for certain about the life of Dharmakirti. Tibetan hagiographies suggest he was a Brahmin born in South India and was the nephew of the Mīmāṃsā scholar Kumārila Bhaṭṭa. When he was young, Kumārila spoke abusively towards Dharmakirti as he was taking his Brahminical garments. This led Dharmakirti to take the robes of the Buddhist order instead, resolving to "vanquish all the heretics." As a student of Buddhism, he first studied under Isvarasena, and later moved to Nalanda where he interacted with 6th century Dharmapala. However, the accuracy of the Tibetan hagiographies is uncertain, and scholars place him in the 7th-century instead. This is because of inconsistencies in different Tibetan and Chinese texts, and because it is around the middle of 7th-century, and thereafter, that Indian texts begin discussing his ideas, such as the citation of Dharmakirti verses in the works of Adi Shankara. Dharmakīrti is placed by most scholars to have lived between 600 and 660 CE, but a few place him earlier.

Dharmakirti is credited with building upon the work of Dignāga, the pioneer of Buddhist logic, and Dharmakirti has ever since seen as influential in the Buddhist tradition. His theories became normative in Tibet and are studied to this day as a part of the basic monastic curriculum.

The Tibetan tradition considers that Dharmakīrti was ordained as a Buddhist monk at Nālandā by Dharmapāla. In his writings we find the statement that no one will understand the value of his work and that his efforts would soon be forgotten, but history proved his fears wrong.

Philosophy

Historical context
The Buddhist works such as the Yogacarabhumi-sastra and the Mahāyānasūtrālaṅkāra composed before the 6th century, on hetuvidyā (logic, dialectics) are unsystematic, whose approach and structure are heresiological, proselytical and apologetic. Their aims were to defeat non-Buddhist opponents (Hinduism (Brahmanism), Jainism, Ājīvikism, Charvaka (materialists) and others), defend the ideas of Buddhism, develop a line of arguments that monks can use to convert those who doubt Buddhism and to strengthen the faith of Buddhists who begin to develop doubts. Around the middle of the 6th century, possibly to address the polemics of non-Buddhist traditions with their pramana foundations, the Buddhist scholar Dignāga shifted the emphasis from dialectics to more systematic epistemology and logic, retaining the heresiological and apologetic focus. Dharmakīrti followed in Dignāga footsteps, and is credited with systematic philosophical doctrines on Buddhist epistemology, which Vincent Eltschinger states, has "a full-fledged positive/direct apologetic commitment". Dharmakīrti lived during the collapse of the Gupta Empire, a time of great insecurity for Buddhist institutions. The role of Buddhist logic was seen as an intellectual defense against Hindu philosophical arguments formulated by epistemically sophisticated traditions like the Nyaya school. However, Dharmakīrti and his followers also held that the study of reasoning and its application was an important tool for soteriological ends.

Epistemology

Dharmakīrti's philosophy is based on the need to establish a theory of logical validity and certainty grounded in causality. Following Dignāga's Pramāṇasamuccaya, Dharmakīrti also holds that there are only two instruments of knowledge or 'valid cognition' (pramāṇa); "perception" (pratyaksa) and "inference" (anumāṇa). Perception is a non-conceptual knowing of particulars which is bound by causality, while inference is reasonable, linguistic and conceptual. In the Pramāṇavārttika Dharmakīrti defines a pramana as a "reliable cognition". What it means for a cognition to be reliable has been interpreted in different ways. Following commentators like Dharmottara, who define it as meaning that a cognition is able to lead to the obtaining of one's desired object, some modern scholars such as Jose I. Cabezon have interpreted Dharmakīrti as defending a form of Pragmatism. Tillemans sees him as holding to a weak form of correspondence theory, which holds that to "confirm causal efficacy" (arthakriyāsthiti) is to have a justification that an object of cognition has the causal powers we expected. That justification comes through a certain kind of non-conceptual perception (pratyakṣa) which is said to be an "intrinsical source of knowledge" (svataḥ prāmāṇya) which is ultimately reliable. Dharmakīrti sees a cognition as being valid if it has a causal connection with the object of cognition through an intrinsically valid, un-conceptual perception of the object which does not err regarding its functionality. As Dharmakirti says: "A pramāṇa is a reliable cognition. [As for] reliability, it consists in [this cognition's] compliance with [the object's capacity to] perform a function" (Pramāṇavārttika 2.1ac).

Dharmakīrti also holds that there were certain extraordinary epistemic warrants, such as the words of the Buddha, who was said to be an authoritative/reliable person (pramāṇapuruṣa) as well as the 'inconceivable' perception of a yogi (yogipratyakṣa). On the role of scriptural authority, Dharmakīrti has a moderate and nuanced position. For Dharmakīrti, scripture (Buddhist or otherwise) is not a genuine and independent mean of valid cognition. He held that one should not use scripture to guide one on matters which can be decided by factual and rational means and that one is not to be faulted for rejecting unreasonable parts of the scriptures of one's school. However scripture is to be relied upon when dealing with "radically inaccessible things", such as the laws of karma and soteriology. However, according to Dharmakīrti scripture is a fallible source of knowledge and has no claim to certainty.

Metaphysics
According to Buddhologist Tom Tillemans, Dharmakīrti's ideas constitute a nominalist philosophy which disagrees with the Madhyamaka philosophy, by asserting that some entities are real. Dharmakīrti states that the real is only the momentarily existing particulars (svalakṣaṇa), and any universal (sāmānyalakṣaṇa) is unreal and a fiction. He criticized the Nyaya theory of universals by arguing that since they have no causal efficacy, there is no rational reason to posit them. What is real must have powers (śakti), fitness (yogyatā) or causal properties which is what individuates a real particular as an object of perception. Dharmakīrti writes "whatever has causal powers (arthakriyāsamartha), that really exists (paramārthasat)." This theory of causal properties has been interpreted as a form of trope theory. Svalakṣaṇa are said to be part-less, undivided and property-less, and yet they impart a causal force which give rise to perceptual cognitions, which are direct reflections of the particulars.

Dharmakīrti's ultimately real (paramārthasat) particulars are contrasted with conventionally real entities (saṃvṛtisat) as part of his presentation of the Buddhist Two truths doctrine. The conventionally real for him are based on linguistic categories, intellectual constructs and erroneous superimpositions on the flow of reality, such as the idea that universals exist. According to Dharmakīrti, cognitive distortion of the direct perception of particulars occurs during the process of recognition (pratyabhijñāna) and perceptual judgment (niścaya) which arises due to latent tendencies (vāsanā) in the mind left over from past impressions of similar perceptions. These latent dispositions come together into constructed representations of the previously experienced object at the moment of perception, and hence it is an imposed error on the real, a pseudo-perception (pratyakṣābhāsa) which conceals (saṃvṛti) reality while at the same time being practically useful for navigating it. Ignorance (avidyā) for Dharmakīrti is conceptuality, pseudo-perception and superimposition overlaid on the naturally radiant (prabhāsvara) nature of pure perception. By correcting these defilements of perception through mental cultivation as well as using inference to gain "insight born of (rational) reflection" (cintāmayī prajñā) a Buddhist yogi is able to better see the true nature of reality until his perception is fully perfected.

Dharmakīrti, again following Dignāga, also holds that that things as they are in themselves are "ineffable" (avyapadeśya). Language is never about the things in themselves, only about conceptual fictions, hence they are nominalists. Due to this theory, the main issue for Dharmakirti becomes how to explain that it is possible for our arbitrary and conventional linguistic schemas to refer to perceptual particulars which are ineffable and non conceptual. To explain this gap between conceptual schema and perceptual content, Dharmakirti takes up Dignaga's theory of "exclusion" (apoha). Dignāga's view is that "a word talks about entities only as they are qualified by the negation of other things." Dharmakīrti's unique take on this nominalist theory, which underlies his entire system, is to reinterpret it in terms of causal efficacy—arthakriyā (which can also be translated as 'telic function', 'functionality', and 'fulfillment of purpose').

Dharmakīrti developed his philosophical system to defend Buddhist doctrines, so it is no surprise that he developed a number of arguments for rebirth, the Four Noble Truths, the authority of the Buddha, karma, anatta and compassion as well as attacking Brahminical views such as the authority of the Vedas.

Dharmakīrti also defended the Buddhist theory of momentariness (kṣaṇikatva), which held that dharmas spontaneously perish the moment they arise. Dharmakīrti came up with an argument for the theory which stated that since anything that really exists has a causal power, the fact that its causal power is in effect proves it is always changing. For Dharmakīrti, nothing could be a cause while remaining the same, and any permanent thing would be causally inert.

Philosophy of mind
Dharmakīrti defends Dignāga's theory of consciousness being non-conceptually reflexive (svasamvitti or svasaṃvedana). This is the idea that an act of intentional consciousness is also aware of itself as aware. Consciousness is said to illuminate itself like a lamp that illuminates objects in a room as well as itself. Dharmakīrti also defends the Yogācāra theory of "awareness-only" (vijñaptimātratā), which held that 'external objects' of perception do not exist. According to Dharmakīrti, an object of cognition is not external or separate from the act of cognition itself. This is because the object is "necessarily experienced simultaneously with the cognition [itself]" (Pramāṇavārttika 3.387). The view that there is a duality (dvaya) between an object (grāhya) and a subjective cognition (grāhaka) arises out of ignorance.

Dharmakīrti's Substantiation of Other Mindstreams (Saṃtānāntarasiddhi) is a treatise on the nature of the mindstream and Buddhist response to the problem of other minds Dharmakirti held the mindstream to be beginning-less yet also described the mindstream as a temporal sequence, and that as there are no true beginnings, there are no true endings, hence, the "beginningless time" motif that is frequently used to describe the concept of mindstream.

Affiliation
There is disagreement among Indian and Tibetan doxographers as to how to categorise Dharmakīrti's thought. The Gelug school asserts that he expressed Yogācāra views, most non-Gelug Tibetan commentators assert that he expressed Sautrāntika views and, according to one Tibetan source, a number of renowned later Indian Madhyamikas asserted that he expressed Madhyamaka views.

Among modern scholars, some like Tillemans argue that Dharmakīrti represented the Yogācāra school, while Amar Singh argues that he was a Sautrāntika. For Christine Mullikin Keyt, Dharmakīrti represents a "synthesis of two schools of Indian Buddhism, the Sautrantika and the Yogacara." Likewise, Dan Arnold argues that Dharmakīrti's alternating philosophical perspectives of Sautrāntika and Yogācāra views are ultimately compatible and are applied at different levels of his 'sliding scale of analysis.'

There is also a tendency to see Dignāga and Dharmakīrti as founding a new type of Buddhist school or tradition, which is known in Tibetan as "those who follow reasoning" and sometimes is known in modern literature as pramāṇavāda.

Writings and commentaries
Dharmakīrti is credited with the following major works:

Saṃbandhaparikṣhāvrtti (Analysis of Relations)
Pramāṇaviniścaya (Ascertainment of Valid Cognition)
Pramāṇavārttika-kārika (Commentary on Dignāga's Pramāṇasamuccaya 'Compendium of Valid Cognition')
Pramāṇavārttikasvavrtti (Auto-commentary on the above text)
Nyāyabinduprakaraṇa (Drop of Logic)
Hetubindunāmaprakaraṇa (Drop of Reason)
Saṃtānāntarasiddhināmaprakaraṇa (Proof of Others' Mindstreams)
Vādanyāyanāmaprakaraṇa (Reasoning for Debate)

There are various commentaries by later thinkers on Dharmakīrti, the earliest commentators are the Indian scholars Devendrabuddhi (ca. 675 C E.) and Sakyabuddhi (ca. 700 C.E.). Other Indian commentators include Karṇakagomin, Prajñākaragupta, Manorathanandin, Ravigupta and Śaṅkaranandana.

He was extremely influential in Tibet, where Phya pa Chos kyi Seng ge (1182-1251) wrote the first summary of his works, called "Clearing of Mental Obscuration with Respect to the Seven Treatises on Valid Cognition" (tshad ma sde bdun yid gi mun sel). Sakya Pandita wrote the "Treasure on the Science of Valid Cognition" (tshad ma rigs gter) and interpreted Dharmakirti as an anti-realist against Phya pa's realism. These two main interpretations of Dharmakīrti became the foundation for most debates in Tibetan epistemology.

See also
 Pramana
 Buddhist atomism
 Epistemology
 Dignāga
 William of Ockham

References

Bibliography
  extensive discussion of the Dharmakirti's Tibetan reception

 Pecchia, C. (ed., with the assistance of Pierce P.). (2015). Dharmakīrti on the Cessation of Suffering. A Critical Edition with Translation and Comments of Manorathanandin's Vṛtti and Vibhūticandraʼs Glosses on Pramāṇavārttika II.190-216. Leiden, Brill.
 Shcherbatskoy, Fyodor (1932) Buddhist Logic, introduced the West to Buddhist logic, and more specifically to Dignaga. Although pioneering, this work is now regarded as outdated by some Buddhist scholars. — David Loy complains about viewing Buddhist philosophy "through the categories of another system – Stcherbatsky's Kant, Murti's Vedānta, Gudmundsen's Wittgenstein – which (as with earlier interpretations of nirvāṇa) reveals more about the interpreter than the interpreted.".

External links

7th-century Indian philosophers
7th-century Indian writers
Atheist philosophers
Atomists
7th-century Buddhists
Buddhist logic
Buddhist writers
Idealists
Indian Buddhists
Indian scholars of Buddhism
Indian logicians
Srivijaya
Writers from Bihar
Yogacara scholars
Scholars from Bihar
Monks of Nalanda